Leiostyla cheiligona is a species of small air-breathing land snail, a terrestrial pulmonate gastropod mollusk in the family Lauriidae.

Distribution
This species is endemic to Portugal.

References

Leiostyla
Molluscs of Europe
Endemic fauna of Madeira
Gastropods described in 1864
Taxonomy articles created by Polbot
Taxobox binomials not recognized by IUCN